Gangotri Legislative Assembly constituency is one of the 70 assembly constituencies of Uttarakhand a northern state of India. Gangotri is part of Tehri Garhwal Lok Sabha constituency.

Members of Legislative Assembly

Election results

2022

2017

2012

See also
 Uttarkashi (Uttarakhand Assembly constituency)

References

External links
 

2002 establishments in Uttarakhand
Assembly constituencies of Uttarakhand
Constituencies established in 2002
Uttarkashi